Salvatore Pennacchio (born 7 September 1952 in Marano, Italy) is a Catholic archbishop and diplomat of the Holy See, currently president of the Pontifical Ecclesiastical Academy.

Biography
He received his priestly ordination on 18 September 1976 for the Diocese of Aversa. He attended the Pontifical Ecclesiastical Academy and entered the diplomatic service of the Holy See. On 28 November 1998 he was appointed by Pope John Paul II as the apostolic nuncio to Rwanda and titular archbishop of Montemarano. He received episcopal consecration on 6 January 1999 by Pope John Paul II, co-consecrated by Giovanni Battista Re and Francis Monterisi.

On 20 September 2003 he was appointed apostolic nuncio to Thailand, to Singapore, and to Cambodia, as well as apostolic delegate to Myanmar, to Laos, to Malaysia and to Brunei.

On 8 May 2010, Pope Benedict XVI appointed him Apostolic Nuncio to India and on 13 November 2010 to Nepal. On 6 August 2016, Pope Francis appointed him Apostolic Nuncio to Poland.

On 25 January 2023, Pope Francis appointed him as president of the Pontifical Ecclesiastical Academy.

See also
 List of heads of the diplomatic missions of the Holy See

References

External links
 Catholic Hierarchy: Archbishop Salvatore Pennacchio
 GCatholic.org: Archbishop Salvatore Pennacchio
 Biography at the website of the Apostolic Nunciature to India and Nepal

1952 births
Living people
Apostolic Nuncios to India
Apostolic Nuncios to Poland
21st-century Italian Roman Catholic titular archbishops
Pontifical Ecclesiastical Academy alumni
Apostolic Nuncios to Rwanda
Apostolic Nuncios to Thailand
Apostolic Nuncios to Singapore
Apostolic Nuncios to Cambodia
Apostolic Nuncios to Nepal
Apostolic Nuncios to Myanmar
Apostolic Nuncios to Malaysia
Apostolic Nuncios to Laos